Pontos is a 2008 dramatic short film concerning the Greek genocide. The film's duration is a little over 10 minutes and was filmed entirely in Australia. Written, produced and directed by Peter Stefanidis, Pontos aims to capture a small part of the genocide from the perspective of its two central characters played by Lee Mason (Kemal) and Ross Black (Pantzo). In 2008, Pontos was screened at the short film corner at the Festival De Cannes film festival to critical acclaim on 19 May (a day of remembrance for Pontic Greeks).

Plot

The film begins with an unknown figure looking through old photographs of the genocide. Then there is a flashback and we see the protagonist of the film, Pantzo (Ross Black) Pontian partisan, cleaning a bloodied knife with the bodies of Turkish soldiers at his feet. Kemal (Lee Mason) is dragged to Pantzo awaiting execution. Kemal's family is forced to watch. There is another flashback to an earlier time revealing a captured Pantzo forced to watch the brutal murder of his wife and daughter by the same Turkish soldiers now dead.

Flashing forward to Kemal's capture, Kemal antagonizes Pantzo to carry out the execution. Pantzo plunges the knife into the ground leaving a stunned Kemal to ponder why his life was spared.

External links

 First Diatribe Article
 Second Diatribe Article

2008 drama films
2008 films
Australian drama short films
Pontic Greek culture
Works about the Greek genocide
2000s English-language films
2000s Australian films